The Rhodobacteraceae are a family of Pseudomonadota in the order Rhodobacterales within the alpha subgroup. Like all Pseudomonadota, they are gram-negative. It contains  chemoorganotrophs and photoheterotrophs bacteria. Many occur in aquatic habitats.

Genera

Accepted Genera 
The following genera have been effectively and validly published:

 Acidimangrovimonas Ren et al. 2019
 Actibacterium Lucena et al. 2012
 Aestuariibius Park et al. 2018
 Aestuariicoccus Feng et al. 2018
 Aestuariihabitans Yoon et al. 2014
 Aestuariivita Park et al. 2014
 Aestuarium Yu et al. 2019
 Agaricicola Chu et al. 2010
 Albibacillus Hördt et al. 2020
 Albidovulum Albuquerque et al. 2003
 Albimonas Lim et al. 2008
 Albirhodobacter Nupur et al. 2015
 Aliiroseovarius Park et al. 2015
 Aliishimia Kim et al. 2019
 Alkalilacustris Zhang et al. 2019

 Allgaiera Hördt et al. 2020
 Allosediminivita Hördt et al. 2020
 Amaricoccus Maszenan et al. 1997
 Amylibacter Teramoto and Nishijima 2014
 Antarcticimicrobium Zhang et al. 2020
 Antarctobacter Labrenz et al. 1998
 Aquicoccus Feng et al. 2018
 Aquimixticola Park et al. 2015
 Arenibacillus Kim et al. 2019
 Arenibacterium Baek et al. 2020
 Ascidiaceihabitans Kim et al. 2014

 Boseongicola Park et al. 2014
 Brevirhabdus Wu et al. 2015
 Carideicomes Wang et al. 2020

 Celeribacter Ivanova et al. 2010
 Cereibacter Suresh et al. 2015
 Chachezhania Yuan et al. 2020

 Citreimonas Choi and Cho 2006
 Cognatishimia Wirth and Whitman 2018
 Cognatiyoonia Wirth and Whitman 2018

 Cribrihabitans Chen et al. 2014
 Cypionkella Hördt et al. 2020
 Defluviimonas Foesel et al. 2013
 Dinoroseobacter Biebl et al. 2005
 Donghicola Yoon et al. 2007
 Epibacterium Penesyan et al. 2013
 Falsirhodobacter Subhash et al. 2013
 Fertoeibacter Szuroczki et al. 2021
 Flavimaricola Wirth and Whitman 2018
 Fluviibacterium Sun et al. 2020
 Frigidibacter Li and Zhou 2015

 Gemmobacter Rothe et al. 1988
 Haematobacter Helsel et al. 2007
 Hahyoungchilella Kim and Lee 2020
 Halocynthiibacter Kim et al. 2014
 Halodurantibacterium Lv et al. 2015
 Halovulum Sun et al. 2015
 Hasllibacter Kim et al. 2012
 Histidinibacterium Wang et al. 2019

 Hwanghaeicola Kim et al. 2010
 Jannaschia Wagner-Döbler et al. 2003
 Jhaorihella Rekha et al. 2011
 Kandeliimicrobium Wang et al. 2018
 Kangsaoukella Lee et al. 2020
 Lacimonas Zhong et al. 2015
 Leisingera Schaefer et al. 2002
 Lentibacter Li et al. 2012
 Limibaculum Shin et al. 2017
 Limimaricola Wirth and Whitman 2018
 Litoreibacter Romanenko et al. 2011

 Litorisediminicola Yoon et al. 2013
 Litorisediminivivens Park et al. 2016
 Litorivita Hetharua et al. 2018
 Loktanella Van Trappen et al. 2004

 Lutimaribacter Yoon et al. 2009
 Maliponia Jung et al. 2016
 Mameliella Zheng et al. 2010
 Mangrovicoccus Yu et al. 2018
 Maribius Choi et al. 2007
 Marimonas Thongphrom et al. 2017
 Marinibacterium Li et al. 2015
 Marinovum Martens et al. 2006
 Maritimibacter Lee et al. 2007
 Marivita Hwang et al. 2009
 Marivivens Park et al. 2016
 Meinhardsimonia Hördt et al. 2020
 Meridianimarinicoccus Ren et al. 2019
 Methylarcula Doronina et al. 2000
 Monaibacterium Chernikova et al. 2017

 Neptunicoccus Zhang et al. 2018
 Nereida Pujalte et al. 2005
 Nioella Rajasabapathy et al. 2015
 Oceanibium Chang et al. 2019

 Oceanicella Albuquerque et al. 2012
 Oceanicola Cho and Giovannoni 2004
 Oceaniglobus Li et al. 2017
 Octadecabacter Gosink et al. 1998
 Pacificibacter Romanenko et al. 2011
 Pacificitalea Hördt et al. 2020
 Paenimaribius Park et al. 2019
 Paenirhodobacter Wang et al. 2014
 Palleronia Martínez-Checa et al. 2005
 Paracoccus Davis 1969 (Approved Lists 1980)
 Paradonghicola Lee et al. 2019

 Paraphaeobacter Cai et al. 2017
 Pararhodobacter Foesel et al. 2013
 Parasedimentitalea Ding et al. 2020
 Paroceanicella corrig. Liu et al. 2020

 Pelagicola Kim et al. 2008
 Pelagimonas Hahnke et al. 2013
 Pelagivirga Ji et al. 2018
 Pelagovum Ren et al. 2020
 Phaeobacter Martens et al. 2006

 Phycocomes Zhu et al. 2019
 Planktomarina Giebel et al. 2013
 Planktotalea Hahnke et al. 2012

 Pontibaca Kim et al. 2010
 Ponticoccus Hwang and Cho 2008
 Pontivivens Park et al. 2015
 Poseidonocella Romanenko et al. 2012
 Primorskyibacter Romanenko et al. 2011
 Profundibacter Le Moine Bauer et al. 2019
 Profundibacterium Lai et al. 2013
 Pseudaestuariivita Wirth and Whitman 2018
 Pseudodonghicola Hameed et al. 2014
 Pseudogemmobacter Suman et al. 2019
 Pseudohalocynthiibacter Won et al. 2015
 Pseudomaribius Park et al. 2018
 Pseudooceanicola Lai et al. 2015
 Pseudooctadecabacter Billerbeck et al. 2015

 Pseudophaeobacter Breider et al. 2014
 Pseudoprimorskyibacter Hördt et al. 2020
 Pseudopuniceibacterium Zhang et al. 2019
 Pseudorhodobacter Uchino et al. 2003
 Pseudoroseicyclus Park et al. 2016

 Pseudoruegeria Yoon et al. 2007
 Pseudoseohaeicola Park et al. 2015
 Pseudothioclava Kim and Lee 2020
 Psychromarinibacter Qiao et al. 2017
 Pukyongiella Kim et al. 2020
 Puniceibacterium Liu et al. 2014
 Qingshengfaniella Wang et al. 2021
 Rhodobaca Milford et al. 2001
 Rhodobacter Imhoff et al. 1984
 Rhodobaculum Bryantseva et al. 2015
 Rhodophyticola Jung et al. 2019
 Rhodosalinus Guo et al. 2017
 Rhodovulum Hiraishi and Ueda 1994
 Roseibaca Labrenz et al. 2009
 Roseibacterium Suzuki et al. 2006
 Roseicitreum Yu et al. 2011
 Roseicyclus Rathgeber et al. 2005
 Roseinatronobacter Sorokin et al. 2000
 Roseisalinus Labrenz et al. 2005
 Roseivivax Suzuki et al. 1999
 Roseobacter Shiba 1991
 Roseovarius Labrenz et al. 1999
 Rubellimicrobium Denner et al. 2006
 Rubribacterium Boldareva et al. 2010
 Rubricella Yang et al. 2017
 Rubrimonas Suzuki et al. 1999
 Ruegeria Uchino et al. 1999
 Sagittula Gonzalez et al. 1997
 Salinihabitans Yoon et al. 2009
 Salinovum Qu et al. 2017
 Salipiger Martínez-Cánovas et al. 2004
 Sedimentitalea Breider et al. 2014
 Sediminimonas Wang et al. 2009
 Seohaeicola Yoon et al. 2009
 Shimia Choi and Cho 2006

 Silicimonas Crenn et al. 2016
 Sinirhodobacter corrig. Yang et al. 2018

 Solirhodobacter Chu et al. 2020

 Sulfitobacter Sorokin 1996
 Tabrizicola Tarhriz et al. 2014
 Tateyamaria Kurahashi and Yokota 2008

 Thalassobius Arahal et al. 2005
 Thalassococcus Lee et al. 2007

 Thioclava Sorokin et al. 2005

 Tranquillimonas Harwati et al. 2008
 Tritonibacter Klotz et al. 2018
 Tropicibacter Harwati et al. 2009
 Tropicimonas Harwati et al. 2009

 Vannielia Hördt et al. 2020

 Wenxinia Ying et al. 2007
 Xinfangfangia Hu et al. 2018

 Yoonia Wirth and Whitman 2018
 Youngimonas Hameed et al. 2014

Provisional Genera 
The following genera have been published, but not validated according to the Bacteriological Code:
 "Aliisedimentitalea" Kim et al. 2015
 "Alterinioella" Kong et al. 2021
 "Falsigemmobacter" Li et al. 2020
 "Jindonia" Park et al. 2017
 "Ketogulonicigenium" corrig. Urbance et al. 2001

 "Nitropelagi" Jeong and Lee 2016
 "Oceaniovalibus" Liu et al. 2012
 "Oceanomicrobium" Dai et al. 2021
 "Piezobacter" Takai et al. 2009
 "Pikeienuella" Park et al. 2021
 "Plastorhodobacter" Xie et al. 2015
 "Polymorphum" Cai et al. 2011
 "Pseudopontivivens" Park et al. 2018
 "Roseibacula" Nuyanzina-Boldareva and Gorlenko 2014
 "Zongyanglinia" Xu et al. 2021

Candidatus Genera 
The following candidatus genera have been published:

 "Candidatus Halichondriibacter" corrig. Knobloch et al. 2019
 "Candidatus Kopriimonas" Quinn et al. 2012

Phylogeny
The currently accepted taxonomy is based on the List of Prokaryotic names with Standing in Nomenclature and the phylogeny is based on whole-genome sequences.

See also
Biohydrogen

Notes

References

Further reading